West Boylston is a town in Worcester County, Massachusetts, United States and a northern suburb of Worcester. The population was 7,877 at the 2020 census. West Boylston includes the village of Oakdale, located on the opposite side of the Wachusett Reservoir from West Boylston center along Route 140. Although the town was split off from Boylston, it has a larger population than its eastern namesake.

History

West Boylston was originally part of several neighboring towns—Lancaster, Shrewsbury, Boylston, Holden and Sterling. The town was created as part of a dispute between Boylston and West Boylston over the location of a new town meeting house. The town was officially incorporated in 1808.

During the 1800s the town grew with textile and other industries and became a prosperous community. This prosperity was interrupted as the town was selected as the site of the Wachusett Reservoir to provide water for Boston. It was selected due to its location at the junction of three rivers: the Quinapoxet River, the Stillwater River and the Nashua River. In 1897, the Nashua River in the town of Clinton was impounded by the Wachusett Dam, causing  to be flooded in the towns of Boylston, West Boylston, Clinton and Sterling. Over  of West Boylston's land was used for the reservoir, the most of any town. This disrupted the center of town and most of the industrial base. Many buildings were moved to the unaffected parts of the town but the majority were demolished and filled by the reservoir. Over 1700 residents, 300 homes, eight schools, six mills, four churches and one hotel were moved to dry land. The state paid approximately 60 cents on the dollar for use of the land with the promise to pay $12,000 a year to the town for lost tax revenue forever. The reservoir was completed in 1905 and first filled in May 1908. West Boylston's prominent landmark, the Old Stone Church, was left remaining as a reminder of those that lost their homes and jobs to the building of the reservoir. It is one of the most photographed sites in the area.

Today, West Boylston has transformed itself into a bedroom community for Worcester and the surrounding region. Due to the reservoir, the town has been able to preserve much of its rural character, making it an attractive place for recreation and living.

West Boylston's most famous historical resident is Robert Bailey Thomas, the founder of the Old Farmer's Almanac.

Geography
The main water source is the Wachusett Reservoir, which is located in the middle of the town. The town does not get use of this water, it is for Boston. West Boylston gets its water from two town wells.

Adjacent cities and towns

West Boylston is bordered by Sterling to the north, Holden to the west, Worcester, to the south, Shrewsbury to the southeast, and Boylston to the east.

Demographics

As of the 2010 Census, there were 7,669 people, 2,616 households, and 1,817 families residing in the town. The racial makeup of the town was 93.34% White, 4.21% African American, 0.22% Native American, 0.68% Asian, 0.03% Pacific Islander, 0.86% from other races, and 0.67% from two or more races. Hispanic or Latino of any race were 5.27% of the population.

There were 2,616 households, out of which 27.2% had children under the age of 18 living with them, 56.7% were married couples living together, 9.4% had a female householder with no husband present, and 30.5% were non-families. Of all households 25.9% were made up of individuals, and 11.8% had someone living alone who was 65 years of age or older. The average household size was 2.43 and the average family size was 2.98.

In the town, the population was spread out, with 17.5% under the age of 18, 6.5% from 18 to 24, 24.7% from 25 to 44, 33.7% from 45 to 64, and 17.6% who were 65 years of age or older. The median age was 46 years. For every 100 females there were 124.0 males. For every 100 females age 18 and over, there were 130.2 males.
[The population of West Boylston (7,669 in 2010) includes the 1,137 male residents of the Worcester County House of Correction; 14.8% of the town's recorded population. So it would seem that West Boylston has about 25% more males than females (124 males for every 100 females) but that statistic is misleading.]

According the 2015–2019 American Community Survey, the median household income in the town was $88,906, and the median income for a family was $122,500. The per capita income for the town was $34,741. About 5.3% of families and 9.5% of the population were below the poverty line, including 15.0% of those under age 18 and 6.4% of those age 65 or over.

Arts and culture

Museums and other points of interest
West Boylston includes four entries on the National Register of Historic Places:
 Bigelow Tavern Historic District – 60, 64 and 65 Worcester St. (added October 24, 1992)
 Oakdale Village Historic District – 11–68 N. Main, May 8–24, 6–10 Green, 12–23 High, 4–68 Laurel, 14–34 Waushacum, and park at Thomas and N. Main (added August 5, 1996)
 Old Stone Church – Off MA 140 (added May 13, 1973)
 Quinapoxet River Bridge – Thomas St. over the Quinapoxet River at the Wachusett Reservoir (added May 8, 1990)
 Beaman Memorial Public Library (added May 16, 2016)

Government

Education
West Boylston Middle/High School and Major Edwards Elementary School are located in the town.

Library

West Boylston's public library, the Beaman Memorial Public Library, was established in 1878. In fiscal year 2008, the town of West Boylston spent 1.6% ($308,576) of its budget on its public library—approximately $37 per person, per year ($48.76 adjusted for inflation to 2022).  The library building was listed on the National Register of Historic Places in 2016.

Media
The Banner newspaper covers current news about West Boylston; Coulter Press of Clinton, Massachusetts, publishes it. In the past, other newspapers have included the News Recorder and West Boylston Times.

Notable people

 Charlie Baker, professional baseball player
 Dyer Ball, missionary
 Erastus Brigham Bigelow, inventor and businessman, born in West Boylston
 Duke Farrell, MLB catcher
 Jim Ford, film and television actor / stuntman
 Jill Lepore, historian
 Bruce Marshall, professional hockey coach
 J. P. Ricciardi, former general manager of the Major League Baseball Toronto Blue Jays

Photos

References

External links

West Boylston official website
West Boylston Sports
West Boylston Historical Society
West Boylston Water District
Beaman Memorial Public Library
ePodunk: Profile for West Boylston, Massachusetts, MA

Towns in Worcester County, Massachusetts
Populated places established in 1642
1808 establishments in Massachusetts